Walhalla is an unincorporated community in northern Fayette County, Texas, United States.

It was settled in 1830s by German settlers.

External links
 WALHALLA, TX Handbook of Texas Online.

Unincorporated communities in Fayette County, Texas
Unincorporated communities in Texas
German-American history
1830s establishments in the Republic of Texas